The Sugar Hill Suite is an album performed by multi-instrumentalist Joe McPhee's Trio X recorded in 2004 and first released on the CIMP label.

Reception

In JazzTimes Marc Masters wrote "The Sugar Hill Suite alternates between slow meditations and swinging vamps. The opening "For Agusta Savage" is mournful, as McPhee traces an Ornette Coleman-ish tenor sax pattern. Later, "Triple Play" and "Monk's Waltz" are catchy yet reflective, at times even serene. This affinity for combining the somber with the upbeat peaks on the stunning 16-minute title track". On All About Jazz Kurt Gottschalk said "There's plenty of payoff in The Sugar Hill Suite, an oddly plaintive dedication to the spirit of Harlem. Far from the jazz-renaissance throwback that might be expected, it is luxuriously languid".

Track listing 
All compositions by Joe McPhee, Dominic Duval and Jay Rosen
 "For Agusta Savage" - 5:26
 "Triple Play" - 8:08
 "Sometimes I Feel Like a Motherless Child" (Traditional) - 7:15
 "Drop Me Off in Harlem" (Duke Ellington) - 6:53
 "The Sugar Hill Suite" - 16:51
 "Little Sunflower" - 11:32
 "Monk's Waltz" - 4:43
 "Goin' Home" - 6:55

Personnel 
Joe McPhee - tenor saxophone
Dominic Duval - bass
Jay Rosen - drums

References 

Trio X albums
2004 albums
CIMP albums